Ansells End is a hamlet in Hertfordshire, England. The population of the hamlet at the 2011 Census was included in the civil parish of Kimpton.

References

Hamlets in Hertfordshire
North Hertfordshire District